Nova Santa Marta ("New Saint Marta") is a bairro in the District of Sede in the municipality of Santa Maria, in the Brazilian state of Rio Grande do Sul. It is located in west Santa Maria.

Villages 
The bairro contains the following villages: Loteamento Alto da Boa Vista, Loteamento Dez de Outubro, Loteamento Dezoito de Abril, Loteamento Marista, Loteamento Núcleo Central, Loteamento Sete de Dezembro, Nova Santa Marta, Vila Pôr do Sol.

References 

Bairros of Santa Maria, Rio Grande do Sul